In mathematics, the Jacobi elliptic functions are a set of basic elliptic functions. They are found in the description of the motion of a pendulum (see also pendulum (mathematics)), as well as in the design of electronic elliptic filters. While trigonometric functions are defined with reference to a circle, the Jacobi elliptic functions are a generalization which refer to other conic sections, the ellipse in particular. The Jacobi elliptic functions are used more often in practical problems than the Weierstrass elliptic functions as they do not require notions of complex analysis to be defined and/or understood. Carl Friedrich Gauss had already studied special Jacobi elliptic functions in 1797, the lemniscate elliptic functions in particular, but his work was published much later.

Overview

The distribution of the zeros and poles in the -plane is well-known. However, questions of the distribution of the zeros and poles in the -plane remain to be investigated.

In the complex plane of the argument , the twelve functions form a repeating lattice of simple poles and zeroes. The function  will have a zero at the  corner and a pole at the  corner. The twelve functions correspond to the twelve ways of arranging these poles and zeroes in the corners of the rectangle.

Instead of having only one circle, we now have the product of two circles, one real and the other imaginary. The complex plane can be replaced by a complex torus. Each function has two zeroes and two poles at opposite positions on the torus. Among the points  there is one zero and one pole.

The Jacobian elliptic functions are then doubly periodic, meromorphic functions satisfying the following properties:
 There is a simple zero at the corner , and a simple pole at the corner .
 The complex number  is equal to half the period of the function ; that is, the function  is periodic in the direction , with the period being .

Notation

The elliptic functions can be given in a variety of notations, which can make the subject unnecessarily confusing. Elliptic functions are functions of two variables. The first variable might be given in terms of the amplitude , or more commonly, in terms of  given below. The second variable might be given in terms of the parameter ,  or as the elliptic modulus , where , or in terms of the modular angle , where . These four terms are used below without comment to simplify various expressions.

Functions of the form  are trivially set to unity for notational completeness. (This notation is due to Gudermann and Glaisher and is not Jacobi's original notation.)

Throughout this article, .

The functions are notationally related to each other by the multiplication rule: (arguments suppressed)

from which other commonly used relationships can be derived:

The multiplication rule follows immediately from the identification of the elliptic functions with the Neville theta functions

Also note that:

Definition as inverses of elliptic integrals

There is a definition, relating the elliptic functions to the inverse of the incomplete elliptic integral of the first kind. The  that satisfies

is called the Jacobi amplitude:

In this framework, the elliptic sine sn u (Latin: sinus amplitudinis) is given by

and the elliptic cosine cn u (Latin: cosinus amplitudinis) is given by

and the delta amplitude dn u (Latin: delta amplitudinis)

In the above, the value  is a free parameter, usually taken to be real such that , and so the elliptic functions can be thought of as being given by two variables,  and the parameter . The remaining nine elliptic functions are easily built from the above three, and are given in a section below.

In the most general setting,  is a multivalued function (in ) with infinitely many logarithmic branch points (the branches differ by integer multiples of ), namely the points  and  where . This multivalued function can be made single-valued by cutting the complex plane along the line segments joining these branch points (the cutting can be done in non-equivalent ways, giving non-equivalent single-valued functions), thus making  analytic everywhere except on the branch cuts. Since every elliptic function is meromorphic in the whole complex plane (by definition),  (when considered as a single-valued function) is not an elliptic function.

However, the integral inversion above defines a unique single-valued real-analytic function in a real neighborhood of  if  is real.

Jacobi also introduced the coamplitude function:
.

The Jacobi epsilon function can be defined as

and relates the incomplete elliptic integral of the first kind to the incomplete elliptic integral of the second kind (with parameter ):

The Jacobi epsilon function is not an elliptic function. However, unlike the Jacobi amplitude and coamplitude, the Jacobi epsilon function is meromorphic in the whole complex plane (in both  and ).

Note that when , that  then equals the quarter period .

Definition as trigonometry: the Jacobi ellipse

 are defined on the unit circle, with radius r = 1 and angle  arc length of the unit circle measured from the positive x-axis. Similarly, Jacobi elliptic functions are defined on the unit ellipse, with a = 1.  Let

then:

For each angle  the parameter

(the incomplete elliptic integral of the first kind) is computed. 
On the unit circle,  would be an arc length.
The quantity  is related to the incomplete elliptic integral of the second kind (with modulus ) by

and therefore is related to the arc length of an ellipse.
Then the familiar relations from the unit circle:  

read for the ellipse:

These projections may be interpreted as 'definition as trigonometry'. In short:

 and parameter  we get, after inserting the relation:

into:  that:

The latter relations for the x- and y-coordinates of points on the unit ellipse may be considered as generalization of the relations  for the coordinates of points on the unit circle.

The following table summarizes the expressions for all Jacobi elliptic functions pq(u,m) in the variables (x,y,r) and (φ,dn) with

Definition in terms of Jacobi theta functions

Jacobi theta function description

Equivalently, Jacobi's elliptic functions can be defined in terms of his theta functions. If we set , we have

 

Edmund Whittaker and George Watson defined the Jacobi theta functions this way in their textbook A Course of Modern Analysis:

Elliptic integral and elliptic nome

As a function of  it is

Let us define the elliptic nome and the complete elliptic integral of the first kind:

These are two identical definitions of the complete elliptic integral of the first kind:

An identical definition of the nome function can me produced by using a series. Following function has this identity:

By solving this function after q we get:

Important information: Sw(1) = 1, Sw(2) = 2, Sw(3) = 15, Sw(4) = 150, Sw(5) = 1707, ...

Integer number sequences

The Silesian German mathematician Hermann Amandus Schwarz wrote in his work Formeln und Lehrsätze zum Gebrauche der elliptischen Funktionen in the chapter Berechnung der Grösse k on pages 54 to 56 an integer number sequence. This Schwarz number sequence Sw(n) was also analyzed by the mathematicians Karl Theodor Wilhelm Weierstrass and Louis Melville Milne-Thomson in the 20th century. The mathematician Adolf Kneser determined a synthesis method for this sequence based on the following pattern:

 

The Schwarz sequence Sw(n) is entered in the online encyclopedia of number sequences under the number A002103 and the Kneser sequence Kn(n) is entered under the number A227503. The Kneser integer sequence Kn(n) can be constructed by using a special Apéry sequence Ap(n) (OEIS A036917) defined as follows:

And in this way the Kneser number sequence can be defined for every natural number n:

The Kneser sequence can also be produced by its generating function in this way:

 

Following table contains the Schwarz numbers and the Kneser numbers and the Apery numbers:

Definition in terms of Neville theta functions

The Jacobi elliptic functions can be defined very simply using the Neville theta functions:

Simplifications of complicated products of the Jacobi elliptic functions are often made easier using these identities.

Jacobi transformations

The Jacobi imaginary transformations

The Jacobi imaginary transformations relate various functions of the imaginary variable i u or, equivalently, relations between various values of the m parameter. In terms of the major functions:

Using the multiplication rule, all other functions may be expressed in terms of the above three. (The arguments  are suppressed)
{| class="wikitable" style="text-align:center"
|+ Jacobi Imaginary transformations 
!colspan="2" rowspan="2"|
!colspan="4"|q
|-
! c
! s
! n
! d
|-
!rowspan="6"|p
|-
! c
| 1 || i ns || nc || nd
|-
! s
| −i sn || 1 || −i sc || −i sd
|-
! n
| cn || i cs || 1 || cd
|-
! d
| dn || i ds || dc || 1
|}

Since the hyperbolic trigonometric functions are proportional to the circular trigonometric functions with imaginary arguments, it follows that the Jacobi functions will yield the hyperbolic functions for m=1. In the figure, the Jacobi curve has degenerated to two vertical lines at x = 1 and x = −1.

The Jacobi real transformations 

The Jacobi real transformations yield expressions for the elliptic functions in terms with alternate values of m. (The arguments  are suppressed)

{| class="wikitable" style="text-align:center"
|+ Jacobi real transformations 
!colspan="2" rowspan="2"|
!colspan="4"|q
|-
! c
! s
! n
! d
|-
!rowspan="6"|p
|-
! c
|  || ||  || 
|-
! s
| ||  ||  || 
|-
! n
|  ||  ||  || 
|-
! d
|  ||  ||  || 
|}

Other Jacobi transformations 

Jacobi's real and imaginary transformations can be combined in various ways to yield three more simple transformations
. The real and imaginary transformations are two transformations in a group (D3 or anharmonic group) of six transformations. If

is the transformation for the m parameter in the real transformation, and

is the transformation of m in the imaginary transformation, then the other transformations can be built up by successive application of these two basic transformations, yielding only three more possibilities:

These five transformations, along with the identity transformation (μU(m) = m) yield the six-element group. With regard to the Jacobi elliptic functions, the general transformation can be expressed using just three functions:

where i = U, I, IR, R, RI, or RIR, identifying the transformation, γi is a multiplication factor common to these three functions, and the prime indicates the transformed function. The other nine transformed functions can be built up from the above three. The reason the cs, ns, ds  functions were chosen to represent the transformation is that the other functions will be ratios of these three (except for their inverses) and the multiplication factors will cancel.

The following table lists the multiplication factors for the three ps functions, the transformed ms, and the transformed function names for each of the six transformations. (As usual, k2 = m, 1 − k2 = k12 = m′ and the arguments are suppressed)

{| class="wikitable" style="text-align:center"
|+ Parameters for the six transformations
!Transformation i||||||cs'||ns'||ds'
|-
! U
| 1              || m                || cs || ns || ds
|-
! I
| i              || m'    || ns || cs || ds
|-
! IR
| i k           || −m'/m || ds || cs || ns
|-
! R
| k              || 1/m              || ds || ns || cs
|-
! RI
|i k1|| 1/m'  || ns || ds || cs
|-
! RIR
| k1  || −m/m' || cs || ds || ns
|-
|}

Thus, for example, we may build the following table for the RIR transformation. The transformation is generally written  (The arguments  are suppressed)

{| class="wikitable" style="text-align:center"
|+ The RIR transformation 
!colspan="2" rowspan="2"|
!colspan="4"|q
|-
! c
! s
! n
! d
|-
!rowspan="6"|p
|-
! c
|1|| k' cs || cd || cn
|-
! s
| sc|| 1 || sd || sn
|-
! n
| dc ||  ds || 1 || dn
|-
! d
| nc ||  ns || nd || 1
|}

The value of the Jacobi transformations is that any set of Jacobi elliptic functions with any complex-valued parameter m can be converted into another set for which 0 ≤ m ≤ 1 and, for real values of u, the function values will be real.

The Jacobi hyperbola

Introducing complex numbers, our ellipse has an associated hyperbola:

 
from applying Jacobi's imaginary transformation to the elliptic functions in the above equation for x and y.

It follows that we can put . So our ellipse has a dual ellipse with m replaced by 1-m. This leads to the complex torus mentioned in the  Introduction. Generally, m may be a complex number, but when m is real and m<0, the curve is an ellipse with major axis in the x direction. At m=0 the curve is a circle, and for 0<m<1, the curve is an ellipse with major axis in the y direction. At m = 1, the curve degenerates into two vertical lines at x = ±1. For m > 1, the curve is a hyperbola. When m is complex but not real, x or y or both are complex and the curve cannot be described on a real x-y diagram.

Minor functions

Reversing the order of the two letters of the function name results in the reciprocals of the three functions above:

Similarly, the ratios of the three primary functions correspond to the first letter of the numerator followed by the first letter of the denominator:

More compactly, we have

where p and q are any of the letters s, c, d.

Periodicity, poles, and residues 

In the complex plane of the argument u, the Jacobi elliptic functions form a repeating pattern of poles (and zeroes). The residues of the poles all have the same absolute value, differing only in sign. Each function pq(u,m) has an "inverse function" (in the multiplicative sense) qp(u,m) in which the positions of the poles and zeroes are exchanged. The periods of repetition are generally different in the real and imaginary directions, hence the use of the  term "doubly periodic" to describe them.

The Jacobi amplitude and the Jacobi epsilon function are quasi-periodic:

where  is the complete elliptic integral of the second kind with parameter .

The double periodicity of the Jacobi elliptic functions may be expressed as:

where α and β are any pair of integers. K(·) is the complete elliptic integral of the first kind, also known as the quarter period. The power of negative unity (γ) is given in the following table:

{| class="wikitable" style="text-align:center"
|+ 
!colspan="2" rowspan="2"|
!colspan="4"|q
|-
! c
! s
! n
! d
|-
!rowspan="6"|p
|-
! c
|0||β || α + β || α
|-
! s
|β || 0 || α || α + β
|-
! n
| α + β || α || 0 || β
|-
! d
| α || α + β || β || 0
|}

When the factor (−1)γ is equal to −1, the equation expresses quasi-periodicity.  When it is equal to unity, it expresses full periodicity. It can be seen, for example, that for the entries containing only α when α is even, full periodicity is expressed by the above equation, and the function has full periods of 4K(m) and 2iK(1 − m).  Likewise, functions with entries containing only β have full periods of 2K(m) and 4iK(1 − m), while those with α + β have full periods of 4K(m) and 4iK(1 − m).

In the diagram on the right, which plots one repeating unit for each function, indicating phase along with the location of poles and zeroes, a number of regularities can be noted: The inverse of each function is opposite the diagonal, and has the same size unit cell, with poles and zeroes exchanged. The pole and zero arrangement in the auxiliary rectangle formed by (0,0), (K,0), (0,K′) and (K,K′) are in accordance with the description of the pole and zero placement described in the introduction above. Also, the size of the white ovals indicating poles are a rough measure of the absolute value of the residue for that pole. The residues of the poles closest to the origin in the figure (i.e. in the auxiliary rectangle) are listed in the following table:

{| class="wikitable" style="text-align:center; width:200px”"
|+ Residues of Jacobi Elliptic Functions
!colspan="2" rowspan="2"|
!colspan="4"|q
|-
! width="40pt"|c
! width="40pt"|s
! width="40pt"|n
! width="40pt"|d
|-
!rowspan="6"|p
|-
! height="40pt" |c
|  ||1||||
|-
! height="40pt" |s
| || ||||
|-
! height="40pt" |n
|||1|| ||
|-
! height="40pt" | d
| -1 || 1 ||  ||  
|-
|}

When applicable, poles displaced above by 2K or displaced to the right by 2K′ have the same value but with signs reversed, while those diagonally opposite have the same value. Note that poles and zeroes on the left and lower edges are considered part of the unit cell, while those on the upper and right edges are not.

Special values
Setting  gives the lemniscate elliptic functions  and :

For the Jacobi amplitude,  and  where  is the Gudermannian function.

In general if neither of p,q is d then .

Identities

Half Angle formula

K formulas
Half K formula

	
Third K formula
	

	
To get x3, we take the tangent of twice the arctangent of the modulus.
	
Also this equation leads to the sn-value of the third of K:
	

	

	
These equations lead to the other values of the Jacobi-Functions:
	

	

	
Fifth K formula
	
Following equation has following solution:
	

	

	
To get the sn-values, we put the solution x into following expressions:

Relations between squares of the functions 
Relations between squares of the functions can be derived from two basic relationships (Arguments (u,m) suppressed):

where m + m' = 1. Multiplying by any function of the form nq yields more general equations:

With q = d, these correspond trigonometrically to the equations for the unit circle and the unit ellipse , with x = cd, y = sd and r = nd. Using the multiplication rule, other relationships may be derived. For example:

Addition theorems 
The functions satisfy the two square relations (dependence on m supressed)

From this we see that (cn, sn, dn) parametrizes an elliptic curve which is the intersection of the two quadrics defined by the above two equations. We now may define a group law for points on this curve by the addition formulas for the Jacobi functions

The Jacobi epsilon function satisfies a quasi-addition theorem:

Double angle formulae can be easily derived from the above equations by setting x = y. Half angle formulae are all of the form:

where:

Jacobi elliptic functions as solutions of nonlinear ordinary differential equations
The derivatives of the three basic Jacobi elliptic functions are:

These can be used to derive the derivatives of all other functions as shown in the table below (arguments (u,m) suppressed):

With the addition theorems above and for a given m with 0 < m < 1 the major functions are  therefore solutions to the following nonlinear ordinary differential equations:

  solves the differential equations  and 
  solves the differential equations  and 
  solves the differential equations  and 

The Jacobi amplitude provides a non-trivial solution of the differential equation describing the exact motion of a simple pendulum. In particular,

Expansion in terms of the nome

Then the functions have expansions as Lambert series

when .

For the Jacobi amplitude,

Bivariate power series expansions have been published by Schett.

Fast computation
The theta function ratios provide an efficient way of computing the Jacobi elliptic functions. There is an alternative method, based on the arithmetic-geometric mean and Landen's transformations:

Initialize

where .
Define

where .
Then define

If

This is notable for its rapid convergence. It is then trivial to compute all Jacobi elliptic functions from the Jacobi amplitude  on the real line.

In conjunction with the addition theorems for elliptic functions (which hold for complex numbers in general) and the Jacobi transformations, the method of computation described above can be used to compute all Jacobi elliptic functions in the whole complex plane.

Another method of fast computation of the Jacobi elliptic functions via the arithmetic–geometric mean, avoiding the computation of the Jacobi amplitude, is due to Herbert E. Salzer:

Let

Set

Then

Approximation in terms of hyperbolic functions

The Jacobi elliptic functions can be expanded in terms of the hyperbolic functions.  When  is close to unity, such that  and higher powers of   can be neglected, we have:
 sn(u): 
 cn(u): 
 dn(u): 
For the Jacobi amplitude,

Continued fractions

If , where  is the complete elliptic integral of the first kind, then holds the following continued fraction expansion

For , : pg. 374

For , : pg. 375

For , : pg. 220

For , : pg. 374

For , : pg. 375

Inverse functions 

The inverses of the Jacobi elliptic functions can be defined similarly to the inverse trigonometric functions; if , . They can be represented as elliptic integrals, and power series representations have been found.

Map projection 

The Peirce quincuncial projection is a map projection based on Jacobian elliptic functions.

See also
 Elliptic curve
 Schwarz–Christoffel mapping
 Carlson symmetric form
 Jacobi theta function
 Ramanujan theta function
 Dixon elliptic functions
 Abel elliptic functions
 Weierstrass elliptic functions
 Lemniscate elliptic functions

Notes

References
 
 N. I. Akhiezer, Elements of the Theory of Elliptic Functions (1970) Moscow, translated into English as AMS Translations of Mathematical Monographs Volume 79 (1990) AMS, Rhode Island 
 A. C. Dixon  The elementary properties of the elliptic functions, with examples (Macmillan, 1894)
 Alfred George Greenhill The applications of elliptic functions (London, New York, Macmillan, 1892)
 Edmund T. Whittaker, George Neville Watson: A Course in Modern Analysis. 4th ed. Cambridge, England: Cambridge University Press, 1990. S. 469–470.
 H. Hancock Lectures on the theory of elliptic functions (New York, J. Wiley & sons, 1910)

  P. Appell and E. Lacour Principes de la théorie des fonctions elliptiques et applications (Paris, Gauthier Villars, 1897)
  G. H. Halphen Traité des fonctions elliptiques et de leurs applications (vol. 1) (Paris, Gauthier-Villars, 1886–1891)
  G. H. Halphen Traité des fonctions elliptiques et de leurs applications (vol. 2) (Paris, Gauthier-Villars, 1886–1891)
  G. H. Halphen Traité des fonctions elliptiques et de leurs applications (vol. 3) (Paris, Gauthier-Villars, 1886–1891)
  J. Tannery and J. Molk 	Eléments de la théorie des fonctions elliptiques. Tome I, Introduction. Calcul différentiel. Ire partie (Paris : Gauthier-Villars et fils, 1893)
  J. Tannery and J. Molk  	Eléments de la théorie des fonctions elliptiques. Tome II, Calcul différentiel. IIe partie (Paris : Gauthier-Villars et fils, 1893)
  J. Tannery and J. Molk  	Eléments de la théorie des fonctions elliptiques. Tome III, Calcul intégral. Ire partie, Théorèmes généraux. Inversion (Paris : Gauthier-Villars et fils, 1893)
  J. Tannery and J. Molk  	Eléments de la théorie des fonctions elliptiques. Tome IV, Calcul intégral. IIe partie, Applications (Paris : Gauthier-Villars et fils, 1893)
  C. Briot and J. C. Bouquet Théorie des fonctions elliptiques (  Paris : Gauthier-Villars, 1875)
 Toshio Fukushima: Fast Computation of Complete Elliptic Integrals and Jacobian Elliptic Functions. 2012, National Astronomical Observatory of Japan (国立天文台)
 Lowan, Blanch und Horenstein: On the Inversion of the q-Series Associated with Jacobian Elliptic Functions. Bull. Amer. Math. Soc. 48, 1942
 H. Ferguson, D. E. Nielsen, G. Cook: A partition formula for the integer coefficients of the theta function nome. Mathematics of computation, Volume 29, Nummer 131, Juli 1975
 J. D. Fenton and R. S. Gardiner-Garden: Rapidly-convergent methods for evaluating elliptic integrals and theta and elliptic functions. J. Austral. Math. Soc. (Series B) 24, 1982, S. 57
 Adolf Kneser: Neue Untersuchung einer Reihe aus der Theorie der elliptischen Funktionen. J. reine u. angew. Math. 157, 1927. pages 209 – 218

External links
 
 

 
Elliptic functions
Special functions